Sheng Liang is the CEO and Co-Founder of Rancher Labs.  

Previously he was the lead developer on the original Java virtual machine (JVM) team at Sun Microsystems, Inc., and the chief technology officer of the Cloud Platforms groups at Citrix Systems after their acquisition of Cloud.com, where he was co-founder and chief executive officer and founder of Cloud.com in July 2011.

Biography 
Liang has a PhD from Yale University in Computer Science. He did his undergraduate degree from University of Science and Technology of China.

Sheng also was co-founder and chief technology officer of Teros, a provider of perimeter and network security solutions for enterprises and service providers, acquired by Citrix Systems, Inc. in 2005. He also served as vice president of engineering at SEVEN Networks, and as director of software engineering at Openwave Systems.

References

External links 
 DevX - Open Source Solutions for Managing Private and Public Clouds
 ESJ - Q&A: Building a Private Cloud
 Java.net - Launch Java Applications From Assembly Language Programs
 The Register - Cloud.com takes on virty infrastructure

Yale University alumni
Living people
American people of Chinese descent
American technology chief executives
American chief technology officers
Year of birth missing (living people)